Oleh Kramarenko may refer to:
Oleh Kramarenko (sprinter), Ukrainian sprinter
Oleh Kramarenko (footballer born 1956), Ukrainian Soviet footballer and coach
Oleh Kramarenko (footballer born 1994), Ukrainian footballer